The 13th World Cup season began in December 1978 in Austria and concluded in March 1979 in Japan.

The overall winners were Peter Lüscher of Switzerland, his first overall win, and Annemarie Moser-Pröll of Austria, her sixth (which remained the record until 2017–18, when Austria's Marcel Hirscher won his seventh overall title).  Although Ingemar Stenmark did not win the overall title due to restrictions on the number of races that counted for overall championship points, he won 13 races during the season (including the last four in a row and six of the last seven) to break Jean-Claude Killy's record of 12 race wins during the inaugural season of the World Cup, which (as of 2018) still stands as the record for most wins by a male skier in a World Cup season.

The World Cup race scoring system, which had remained unchanged since the start of the World Cup in 1967 as a "Top 10" points system (ranging from 25 points for first, 20 for second, 15 for third, and down to 1 point for tenth), was amended this season for the final two downhills and the final three giant slaloms and slaloms to a "Top 25" system (ranging from 25 points for first to 1 point for 25th).  This system was abandoned after the end of the season, and a new "Top 15" system was introduced beginning in 1980.

Calendar

Men

Ladies

Men

Overall 

see complete table

In Men's Overall World Cup 1978/79 the best 3 results of each discipline count; best three downhills, best three giant slaloms, best three slaloms and best three combined. 37 racers had a point deduction. Ingemar Stenmark had 260 (!) points deduction and won 13 races.

Downhill 

see complete table

In Men's Downhill World Cup 1978/79 the best 5 results count. Seven racers had a point deduction, which are given in brackets. Peter Müller won the cup with only one win. There were 8 different winners in 9 races. Leonardo David crashed in the race No. 29. He died after being in a coma for nearly six years.

Giant Slalom 

see complete table

In Men's Giant Slalom World Cup 1978/79 the best 5 results count. Nine racers had a point deduction, which are given in brackets. Ingemar Stenmark won the cup with maximum points by winning ALL 10 events. He won his fourth Giant Slalom World Cup.

Slalom 

see complete table

In Men's Slalom World Cup 1978/79 the best 5 results count. Six racers had a point deduction, which are given in brackets. Ingemar Stenmark won his fifth Slalom World Cup in a row.

Combined 

see complete table

There was no special discipline world cup for Combined awarded. The best three results only count for the Overall World Cup.  However, Peter Lüscher's strong performance in this discipline was the critical factor in his victory in the Overall.

Ladies

Overall 

see complete table

In Women's Overall World Cup 1978/79 the best 3 results of each discipline count; best three downhills, best three giant slaloms, best three slaloms and best three combined. 25 racers had a point deduction. Annemarie Moser-Pröll won her sixth Overall World Cup - this record is still unbeaten.

Downhill 

see complete table

In Women's Downhill World Cup 1978/79 the best 5 results count. Five racers had a point deduction, which are given in brackets. Annemarie Moser-Pröll won 6 races out of 7 and five races in a row. She won the World Cup with maximum points. Together with the last two downhill races last season 1977/78, she won 7 downhill races in a row. She won her seventh Downhill World Cup - this record is still unbeaten.

Giant Slalom 

see complete table

In Women's Giant Slalom World Cup 1978/79 the best 5 results count. Four racers had a point deduction, which are given in brackets. Christa Kinshofer won five races in a row. She won the World Cup with maximum points.

Slalom 

see complete table

In Women's Slalom World Cup 1978/79 the best 5 results count. Six racers had a point deduction, which are given in brackets.

Combined 

see complete table

There was no special discipline world cup for Combined awarded. The best three results only count for the Overall World Cup.

Nations Cup

Overall

Men

Ladies

References

External links
FIS-ski.com - World Cup standings - 1979
FIS Alpine Skiing World Cup at SVT's open archive (including the 1978-1979 season) 

FIS Alpine Ski World Cup
World Cup
World Cup